Fero Lasagavibau (born May 27, 1976) is a Fijian former rugby union footballer. He made his debut for  against the All Blacks in 1997. He took part at the 1999 Rugby World Cup, playing 3 matches in the tournament and made his last appearance for  against  in 2002. He also played for Northland in the National Provincial Championship.

References

External links
 
 Fiji Rugby Profile
 Teivovo Profile

1976 births
Fijian rugby union players
Living people
Rugby union wings
Northland rugby union players
Fiji international rugby union players
Pacific Islanders rugby union players
I-Taukei Fijian people